O. maximus  may refer to:
 Ornithorhynchus maximus, a supposed extinct platypus species, now known to be based on an echidna
 Otomys maximus, the large Vlei rat, a rodent species found in Angola, Botswana, Democratic Republic of the Congo, Namibia and Zambia

See also
 Maximus (disambiguation)